Puthumbaka Bharathi served as the Member of the Legislative Assembly for Sattenapalli constituency in Andhra Pradesh, India, between 1994 and 1999. They represented the Communist Party of India (Marxist).

References

Andhra Pradesh MLAs 1994–1999
Communist Party of India (Marxist) politicians from Andhra Pradesh
People from Guntur district
Telugu politicians